Imam Fathuroman (born on 31 May 1994) is an Indonesian professional footballer who plays as a defensive midfielder for Liga 2 club Persikab Bandung.

Club career

Sulut United
On 20 June 2019, Imam signed a one-year contract with Liga 2 club Sulut United. He made 16 league appearances for Sulut United in the 2019 Liga 2 (Indonesia)

References

External links
 Imam Fathuroman at Soccerway
 Imam Fathuroman at Liga Indonesia

1994 births
Association football forwards
Living people
Indonesian footballers
Liga 1 (Indonesia) players
Bandung Raya players
Pelita Bandung Raya players
Sportspeople from Bandung